Newfoundland Colony was an English and, later, British colony established in 1610 on the island of Newfoundland off the Atlantic coast of Canada, in what is now the province of Newfoundland and Labrador. That followed decades of sporadic English settlement on the island, which was at first seasonal, rather than permanent. It was made a Crown colony in 1824 and a Dominion in 1907.  Its economy collapsed during the Great Depression of the 1930s when the British Parliament passed the Newfoundland Act 1933, and on 16 February 1934, the British government appointed a six-member Commission of Government to govern the country. In 1949, the country voted to join Canada as the Province of Newfoundland.

History

Indigenous people like the Beothuk (known as the Skræling in Greenlandic Norse), and Innu were the first inhabitants of Newfoundland and Labrador. During the late 15th century, European explorers like João Fernandes Lavrador, Gaspar Corte-Real, John Cabot, Jacques Cartier and others began visiting the area. From around the beginning of the 16th century, fishing vessels with English, Portuguese, French and Spanish crews started visiting on a seasonal basis. At some point during the early 16th Century, some of these fishing crews founded an informal settlement at Placentia. The Beothuk gradually became extinct as a people, as they experienced a population decline as a result of infectious diseases introduced by European colonists and the loss of their ancestral territory due to colonial settlement.

From 1610 onward, English colonists established colonial settlements in Newfoundland, led by proprietary governors, as England tried to create North American footholds. John Guy was governor of the first settlement at Cuper's Cove. Other settlements were Bristol's Hope, Renews, New Cambriol, South Falkland and Avalon, which was organized as a province in 1623. The first governor given jurisdiction over all of Newfoundland was Sir David Kirke in 1638. During this period, France had also established settlements in the region, particularly to the west in what is now Quebec. It had strong trading ties to many of the indigenous peoples along the Atlantic Coast, including the Mi'kmaq and other Algonquian-speaking peoples. 

The rivalry between England and France in Europe was played out in conflicts in North America, where they struggled for predominance. This was particularly true in Newfoundland, where the English colonial settlements on the eastern coasts were in close proximity to the French claims in Southern Newfoundland, which the French dubbed Plaisance. The Newfoundland colony was nearly obliterated during the Avalon Peninsula Campaign of King William's War.  In 1696, the French and allied Mi'kmaq armed forces wiped out all but a handful of English settlements on the island of Newfoundland. Over the next year, the English repopulated and rebuilt the colony. The Treaty of Utrecht in 1713 ceded all of Newfoundland to the British Crown.

Given the Newfoundland colony's isolation from the more southern British colonies in America (and proximity to the still-loyal colony of Nova Scotia), it did not become involved in the colonial rebellion of the 1770s. After the American Revolutionary War ended in 1783 with the independence of the United States, Newfoundland Colony became part of British North America. The Crown resettled some Loyalists in Newfoundland, but most were given land in Nova Scotia and present-day Ontario. In 1809 the British Imperial government detached Labrador from Lower Canada for transfer to the Newfoundland Colony.

It became an official Crown colony in 1825, and Thomas John Cochrane, an officer of the Royal Navy, was appointed as its first governor. He directed the construction of Government House, which is located between the sites of Fort William and Fort Townshend. All three have been designated National Historic Sites. The colony was granted a constitution in 1832, and Cochrane became its first civil governor.

The colony was granted self-governing status in 1854. Philip Francis Little was the first Premier of Newfoundland Colony between 1855 and 1858. The colony rejected confederation with Canada in the period of 1864–69. In 1907, Newfoundland became the Dominion of Newfoundland, a Dominion of the British Empire. Due to economic hardship in 1934 it suspended its self-government and accepted rule by a royal commission. Together with Labrador, an area on the mainland, it confederated with Canada in 1949 as the province of Newfoundland.

See also
 British Empire
 Dominion of Newfoundland
 History of Newfoundland and Labrador
 Newfoundland (island)
 Newfoundland and Labrador
 List of lieutenant governors of Newfoundland and Labrador

References

English colonization of the Americas
Former British colonies and protectorates in the Americas
History of Newfoundland and Labrador by location
Former English colonies
States and territories disestablished in 1783
States and territories established in 1610

1865 establishments in the British Empire
1610 establishments in the British Empire